Titley may refer to:

Places
Titley, Herefordshire, a village
Titley, Texas, Brewster County, Texas, United States
Titley Pool, a lake in Herefordshire

Surname
Alan Titley (born in 1947), Irish novelist and translator
Albert Titley (1918–1986), English football player
Craig Titley, American screenwriter
David Titley, American meteorology professor
Edward Titley (1911–1943), English cricket player
Gary Titley (born in 1950), British Labour politician
Mark Titley, Welsh rugby player
Walter Titley (circa 1698–1768), English diplomat